Merritt David Janes is an American stage actor and singer. He comes from a family of musicians and studied to be a music teacher at the University of Maine. He went on to study theatre at Circle in the Square Theatre School before becoming involved with national touring companies of Broadway shows in 2007.

Professional career

Janes first toured nationally in 2007 with The Wedding Singer and starred as Robbie Hart. He then played Sweeney Todd in the second national tour of John Doyle's Sweeney Todd: The Demon Barber of Fleet Street revival production.

In February 2010, Janes joined the fourth national tour of Beauty and the Beast as Lumiere and stayed with the tour company for over a year. On September 9, 2011, Janes originated the role of Lord Farquaad in the second national tour (first non-equity tour) of Shrek the Musical.

Janes originated the role of Agent Carl Hanratty, opposite Stephen Anthony as Frank Abagnale, Jr., in the first national tour of Catch Me If You Can, which began on October 3, 2012. He stayed with the company until its final show on June 30, 2013.

Janes toured with the re-imagined North American touring company of The Phantom of the Opera, which began on November 27, 2013.

Janes is currently starring in the ensemble of the original Broadway cast of Andrew Lloyd Webber's musical School of Rock. On August 24, 2017, it was announced that Janes will join the first National Tour of School of Rock (musical), performing as Dewey at select performances.

References

External links
 Official Website

American male film actors
Living people
American male musical theatre actors
American male television actors
Year of birth missing (living people)